Lorenzo Carnelli (1887 – 1960) was a Uruguayan lawyer and politician who belonged to the National Party.

In 1925, he left the National Party and founded the Radical National Party. In the elections of 1927, he got 2.2% of the vote. Blanco historical leader Luis Alberto de Herrera lost these elections by 1% of the vote and Carnelli is often cited as the reason for this.

1887 births
1960 deaths
20th-century Uruguayan lawyers
National Party (Uruguay) politicians
Candidates for President of Uruguay